Zubizarreta is a Basque surname. Notable people with the surname include:

Ibán Espadas Zubizarreta, Spanish footballer
Ángel Garma Zubizarreta, Spanish-Argentine psychoanalyst
Carmen Garayalde Zubizarreta, Uruguayan artist 
Àlex Monner Zubizarreta, Spanish actor
Ainhoa Murúa Zubizarreta, Spanish triathlete
Andoni Zubizarreta (born 1961), Spanish football goalkeeper
Carlos Zubizarreta (1904–1972), Paraguayan writer
Denise Zubizarreta (born 1984), Interdisciplinary Artist
Félix Zubizarreta, Spanish footballer
Iker Zubizarreta, Venezuelan footballer, grandson of Félix
Izaskun Zubizarreta Guerendiain (born 1970), Spanish ski mountaineer
Patxi Zubizarreta (born 1964), Spanish writer
Tere A. Zubizarreta, Cuban-American advertiser
Valentín Zubizarreta y Unamunsaga (1862–1948), Cuban Roman Catholic bishop

Basque-language surnames